Cláudia Rafaela Teixeira Pascoal  (born 12 October 1994) is a Portuguese singer and songwriter. She represented Portugal at the Eurovision Song Contest 2018 with the song "O jardim".

Career

2010–2015: Ídolos and Factor X
In 2010, Pascoal participated in talent show Ídolos, and in 2013 she participated in the first season of talent show Factor X. In 2014, Pascoal auditioned to present talk show Curto Circuito on SIC Radical, and ended up in third place. In 2015, she participated in Ídolos for a second time.

2017–2018: The Voice Portugal and Eurovision Song Contest

In 2017, she participated on the fifth season of talent show The Voice Portugal and was eventually eliminated in the semi-finals placing 6th overall. In 2018, Pascoal won the Festival da Canção, the national contest to select the Portuguese entry for the Eurovision Song Contest, with the song "O jardim", written by Isaura. As the host entry, she automatically qualified to the final. In the final the song received a total of 39 points and placed 26th.

2019–2020: !
In 2019, Pascoal released two singles, "Ter e Não Ter" in March, followed by a collaboration with Samuel Uria for "Viver" in November. In March 2020, she released her first studio album !, as well as the third single from the album, "Espalha Brasas".

Discography

Studio albums

Singles

Notes

References

1994 births
Living people
21st-century Portuguese women singers
Eurovision Song Contest entrants for Portugal
Eurovision Song Contest entrants of 2018
The Voice of Portugal contestants